Oxycera pygmaea, the pygmy soldier, is a European species of soldier fly.

Description
Mesonotum punctate, with decumbent grey hairs. Both male and female black with yellow humeri, yellow notopleural margin, and small yellow spots on postalar calli.

Biology
The habitat is wetland, calcareous seepages. The flight period is from June to July.

Distribution
Northern Europe Central Europe up to southern Sweden Central

References

External links
Images representing Oxycera pygmaea at Bold

Stratiomyidae
Diptera of Europe
Insects described in 1817